"Victimae paschali laudes" is a sequence prescribed for the Catholic Mass and some liturgical Protestant Eucharistic services on Easter Sunday. It is usually attributed to the 11th-century Wipo of Burgundy, chaplain to Holy Roman Emperor Conrad II, but has also been attributed to Notker Balbulus, Robert II of France, and Adam of St. Victor.

"Victimae paschali laudes" is one of only four medieval sequences that were preserved in the Roman Missal of the Tridentine Mass published in 1570 after the Council of Trent (1545–1563). The three others were "Veni Sancte Spiritus" for the feast of Pentecost, "Lauda Sion" for Corpus Christi, and "Dies irae" for the Requiem Mass (a fifth sequence, "Stabat Mater" for the Feast of the Seven Dolours of the Blessed Virgin Mary, was added to the missal by Pope Benedict XIII in 1727). Before Trent, many other feasts also had their own sequences, and some sixteen different sequences for Easter were in use.

"Victimae paschali laudes" is one of the few sequences that are still in liturgical use today. Its text was set to different music by many Renaissance and Baroque composers, including Busnois, Josquin, Lassus, Willaert, Hans Buchner, Palestrina, Byrd, Perosi, and Fernando de las Infantas. Chorales derived from the sequence include "" (12th century) and Martin Luther's "Christ lag in Todes Banden".

Text

Latin
Victimae paschali laudes
immolent Christiani.

Agnus redemit oves: 
Christus innocens Patri 
reconciliavit peccatores.

Mors et vita duello 
conflixere mirando: 
dux vitae mortuus, 
regnat vivus.

Dic nobis Maria, 
quid vidisti in via?

Sepulcrum Christi viventis, 
et gloriam vidi resurgentis

Angelicos testes, 
sudarium, et vestes.

Surrexit Christus spes mea: 
praecedet suos [vos] in Galilaeam.

[Credendum est magis soli 
Mariae veraci 
Quam Judaeorum Turbae fallaci.]

Scimus Christum surrexisse 
a mortuis vere: 
tu nobis, victor Rex, miserere. 
[Amen.] [Alleluia.] 

English (literal)
Let Christians offer sacrificial 
praises to the passover victim.

The lamb has redeemed the sheep:
The Innocent Christ has reconciled
the sinners to the Father.

Death and life contended
in a spectacular battle:
the dead leader of life
reigns alive.

Tell us, Mary, what did
you see on the way?

"I saw the tomb of the living Christ
and the glory of his rising,

The angelic witnesses, the
shroud, and the clothes."

"Christ my hope is arisen;
he will go before his own [you] into Galilee."

[More to be believed is 
truthful Mary by herself 
than the deceitful crowd of the Jews.]

We know Christ is truly risen from the dead!
On us, you conqueror, King, have mercy!
Amen. [Alleluia.]

English (The English Hymnal)
Christians, to the Paschal Victim 
Offer your thankful praises!

A Lamb the sheep redeemeth:
Christ, who only is sinless, 
Reconcileth sinners to the Father;

Death and life have contended 
In that combat stupendous:
The Prince of Life, who died, 
reigns immortal.

Speak Mary, declaring 
What thou sawest wayfaring:

“The Tomb of Christ, who is living. 
The glory of Jesu’s Resurrection;

Bright angels attesting, 
The shroud and napkin resting.

Yea, Christ my hope is arisen:
To Galilee he goes before you.”

Happy they who hear the witness, 
Mary’s word believing 
Above the tales of Jewry deceiving.

Christ indeed from death is risen, 
our new life obtaining. 
Have mercy, victor King, ever reigning!

English (ICEL)
Christians, to the Paschal Victim
offer sacrifice and praise.

The sheep are ransomed by the Lamb;
and Christ, the undefiled,
hath sinners to his Father reconciled.

Death with life contended: combat strangely ended!
Life's own Champion, slain, yet lives to reign.

Tell us, Mary: say
what thou didst see upon the way.

The tomb the Living did enclose;
I saw Christ's glory as He rose!

The angels there attesting;
shroud with grave-clothes resting.

Christ, my hope, has risen:
He goes before you into Galilee.

That Christ is truly risen
from the dead we know.
Victorious King, Thy mercy show!
Amen. Alleluia.

Jane E. Leeson translation

Christ the Lord is risen today;
Christians, haste your vows to pay;
Offer ye your praises meet
At the Paschal Victim’s feet.
For the sheep the Lamb hath bled,
Sinless in the sinner’s stead;
“Christ is risen,” today we cry;
Now He lives no more to die.

Christ, the victim undefiled,
Man to God hath reconciled;
Whilst in strange and awful strife
Met together Death and Life:
Christians, on this happy day
Haste with joy your vows to pay;
“Christ is risen,” today we cry;
Now He lives no more to die.

Say, O wondering Mary, say,
what thou sawest on thy way.
'I beheld, where Christ had lain,
empty tomb and angels twain,
I beheld the glory bright
of the rising Lord of light;
Christ my hope is risen again;
now he lives, and lives to reign.'

Christ, who once for sinners bled,
Now the first born from the dead,
Throned in endless might and power,
Lives and reigns forevermore.
Hail, eternal Hope on high!
Hail, Thou King of victory!
Hail, Thou Prince of life adored!
Help and save us, gracious Lord.

Νotes

External links

 Victimae paschali laudes from both Codex Las Huelgas (c. 1300–25) and Missale Romanum (1570) (PDF format).
 Settings and translations at Choralwiki 
 Catholic Encyclopedia article

Latin-language Christian hymns
Music for Easter
Medieval music
Latin poems
Medieval Latin poetry